Petr Macholda (born January 25, 1982) is a Czech professional ice hockey player. He played with HC Sparta Praha in the Czech Extraliga during the 2010–11 Czech Extraliga season.

Career statistics

References

External links

1982 births
Augsburger Panther players
Czech ice hockey defencemen
Dresdner Eislöwen players
EV Landshut players
Frankfurt Lions players
Grizzlys Wolfsburg players
HC Karlovy Vary players
HC Litvínov players
HC Slovan Ústečtí Lvi players
HC Sparta Praha players
Kassel Huskies players
Living people
Piráti Chomutov players
PSG Berani Zlín players
Rytíři Kladno players
Sportspeople from Most (city)
Czech expatriate ice hockey players in Germany